Cebrenninus is a genus of crab spiders that was first described by S. P. Benjamin in 2016. It is a senior synonym of Ascurisoma.

Species
 it contains ten species, found in Asia and Africa:
Cebrenninus banten Benjamin, 2016 – Indonesia (Java)
Cebrenninus berau Benjamin, 2016 – Indonesia (Sumatra, Borneo)
Cebrenninus kalawitanus (Barrion & Litsinger, 1995) – Philippines (Luzon)
Cebrenninus magnus Benjamin, 2016 – China, Laos, Thailand, Indonesia (Java), Borneo
Cebrenninus phaedrae Benjamin, 2016 – Malaysia, Indonesia (Sumatra, Borneo)
Cebrenninus rugosus Simon, 1887 (type) – China, Thailand, Laos, Malaysia, Indonesia (Java, Sumatra), Borneo, Philippines
Cebrenninus schawalleri Benjamin, 2016 – Philippines
Cebrenninus srivijaya Benjamin, 2011 – Indonesia (Sumatra)
Cebrenninus striatipes (Simon, 1897) – West Africa, Sri Lanka
Cebrenninus tangi Benjamin, 2016 – Indonesia (Sumatra, Borneo)

Formerly included:
C. laevis (Thorell, 1890) (Transferred to Crockeria)

See also
 List of Thomisidae species

References

Further reading

Araneomorphae genera
Spiders of Africa
Spiders of Asia
Thomisidae